Nicholas Rory Cellan-Jones (born 17 January 1958; "Cellan" pronounced ) is a British journalist and a former BBC News technology correspondent. After working for the BBC for 40 years, he announced in August 2021 he was leaving the corporation in late October.

Early life and education 
Rory Cellan-Jones was born in London in 1958. His father James Cellan Jones was a BBC TV director and film director, and his mother was Sylvia Rich, a BBC secretary. His half-brother Simon Cellan Jones is a film director. Rory was born out of wedlock and was unacquainted with his father and half-siblings until adulthood. Rory uses a hyphen in his surname as his paternal grandparents did; his father had dropped the hyphen.

Cellan-Jones was educated at Dulwich College, an independent school for boys in Dulwich in south London, from 1967–76. He attended Jesus College, Cambridge, obtaining a BA in Modern and Medieval Languages in 1981, and automatic MA three years later.

Career 
After beginning his BBC career as a researcher on the Leeds edition of Look North, he worked in the corporation's London television newsroom for three years before gaining his first on-screen role at BBC Wales. He later returned to London and became the business and economics correspondent, appearing on The Money Programme between 1990 and 1992.

After the dot com crash of 2000, he wrote the book Dot.bomb. He has covered issues such as Black Wednesday, the BCCI scandal and Marks and Spencer's competition troubles.

He has evaluated the growth of websites and internet companies including the rise of Google and Wikipedia and online retailing. From January 2007 until leaving the BBC in 2021, he was the BBC's technology correspondent, with the job of expanding the BBC's coverage of new media and telecoms and the cultural impact of the Internet.

On 30 May 2019, following his presentation of the first BBC broadcast over a 5G network, Cellan-Jones announced via Twitter that he had been diagnosed with early Parkinson's disease, but that he intended to carry on as normal.

He announced on Twitter in August 2021 his intention to leave the BBC in October after 40 years. Along with other well-wishers from the BBC, BBC Breakfast presenter Naga Munchetty replied to him on Twitter, calling him an "utterly brilliant man".

Personal life 
Cellan-Jones is married to economist and author Diane Coyle. The couple have two sons and live in West Ealing, London.

He and Coyle adopted Sophie, a nervous rescue dog from Romania, in December 2022. They have reported on Twitter about Sophie's slow progress in settling in via the hashtag #sophiefromromania.

Publications 
 Dot.Bomb: The Rise and Fall of Dot.com Britain (London: Autumn, 2001)
 The Secret History of Social Networking (BBC, 2012)
 With Mike Hally, Patently Absurd (Audio, 2013)
 Always On: Hope and Fear in the Social Smartphone Era (Bloomsbury Continuum, 2021)

References

External links 

Rory Cellan-Jones on Twitter

1958 births
Living people
Alumni of Jesus College, Cambridge
BBC newsreaders and journalists
English male journalists
English television presenters
People with Parkinson's disease
British technology journalists
English people of Welsh descent
People educated at Dulwich College